Nepenthes lavicola (from Latin: lavicola growing upon lava) is a tropical pitcher plant species endemic to the Geureudong Massif of Aceh, northern Sumatra, where it grows at 2000–2600 m above sea level. It is thought to be most closely related to N. singalana and N. spectabilis.

Nepenthes lavicola is notable for its very prominent bracts, which often overarch the flowers and may be up to 7 cm long at the base of female inflorescences. This species is also unusual in that it bears up to two bracts per pedicel or partial peduncle.

Swiss botanist Albert Friedrich Frey-Wyssling mentioned N. lavicola in a 1931 article as an unidentified Nepenthes species.

Nepenthes lavicola has no known natural hybrids. No forms or varieties have been described.

References

Further reading

 Bauer, U., C.J. Clemente, T. Renner & W. Federle 2012. Form follows function: morphological diversification and alternative trapping strategies in carnivorous Nepenthes pitcher plants. Journal of Evolutionary Biology 25(1): 90–102. 
 Clarke, C.M. 2001. Nepenthes of Sumatra and Peninsular Malaysia. Natural History Publications (Borneo), Kota Kinabalu.
 Hernawati & P. Akhriadi 2006. A Field Guide to the Nepenthes of Sumatra. PILI-NGO Movement, Bogor.
  Koudela, I. 1998. Klíčí nebo neklíčí. Trifid 1998(2): 36–37. (p. 2)
 Meimberg, H., A. Wistuba, P. Dittrich & G. Heubl 2001. Molecular phylogeny of Nepenthaceae based on cladistic analysis of plastid trnK intron sequence data. Plant Biology 3(2): 164–175. 
  Meimberg, H. 2002.  PhD thesis, Ludwig Maximilian University of Munich, Munich.
 Meimberg, H. & G. Heubl 2006. Introduction of a nuclear marker for phylogenetic analysis of Nepenthaceae. Plant Biology 8(6): 831–840. 
 Meimberg, H., S. Thalhammer, A. Brachmann & G. Heubl 2006. Comparative analysis of a translocated copy of the trnK intron in carnivorous family Nepenthaceae. Molecular Phylogenetics and Evolution 39(2): 478–490. 

Carnivorous plants of Asia
lavicola
Endemic flora of Sumatra
Critically endangered flora of Asia
Plants described in 1996